Cute aggression, or playful aggression, is superficially aggressive behaviour caused by seeing something cute, such as a human baby or young animal. People experiencing cute aggression may grit their teeth, clench their fists, or feel the urge to bite, pinch, and squeeze something they consider cute.

Terminology
The first research into cute aggression was led by Oriana Aragón. The term "cute aggression" was published widely in 2013, after Rebecca Dyer and Aragón presented their team's early research on the topic at the annual meeting of the Society for Personality and Social Psychology on January 18. In 2015, Aragón and colleagues published their first academic paper on the subject, using the alternative term "playful aggression", defined as follows:

Playful aggression is in reference to the expressions that people show sometimes when interacting with babies. Sometimes we say things and appear to be more angry than happy, even though we are happy. For example some people grit their teeth, clench their hands, pinch cheeks, or say things like "I want to eat you up!" It would be difficult to ask about every possible behavior of playful aggression, so we ask generally about things of this kind—calling them playful aggressions.

In other languages
The concept of playful aggression is also captured in several non-English terms. In Filipino, for example, the word  refers to "the gritting of teeth and the urge to pinch or squeeze something that is unbearably cute". In Indonesian, the word  refers to the built-up feeling you feel when seeing cute objects, which then leads up to the gritting teeth or the urge to pinch. The word  in Malay encapsulates cute aggression but can also ambiguously mean anger or frustration. In Thai, the concept is called . In Spain and some Latin American countries, it is referred to as “the thing”. For example,  “That kitten gives me the thing”, followed by pinching or clenching of teeth and biting down but joyful movement.

Function
Playful aggression is a type of "dimorphous" display, in which a positive experience elicits expressions usually associated with negative emotions. This behaviour occurs more commonly in individuals who experience dimorphous emotions across a range of situations, and may help to regulate emotions by balancing an overwhelmingly positive emotion with a negative response.

Intense positive feelings often produce hybrid categorically positive and typical negative expressions. This is commonly witnessed in situations in which a person is so overwhelmed by happiness that they begin to tear up or even cry. Such regulation of emotion has been coined "dimorphous expression". The dimorphous expression model seeks to identify the validity of the phenomenon via a study involving a series of questions asked to subjects in conditions where they were not exposed to a cute stimulus and in conditions where they were exposed.

Natural tendencies 

Human beings possess the natural tendency of care-taking. As a species, humans rely heavily upon parental care in order for their offspring to survive. Humans have very low reproductive rates relative to other species which amplifies the importance of parental care toward the survival of their very few offspring. These feelings tend to be on a continuous scale rather than a particular threshold value. The gradient is most intense with objects that we perceive to be more cute in comparison to objects that are not as cute, but still generate a response.

Notes

Explanatory notes

Citations 

Aggression
Emotions